The 2015 NBL Finals was the championship series of the 2014–15 NBL season and the conclusion of the season's playoffs. The New Zealand Breakers defeated the Cairns Taipans in two games (2–0) to claim their fourth NBL championship.

Format
The 2014–15 National Basketball League Finals will be played in February and March 2015 between the top four teams of the regular season, consisting of two best-of-three semi-final and final series, where the higher seed hosts the first and third games.

Qualification

Qualified teams

Ladder

Seedings

 Cairns Taipans
 New Zealand Breakers
 Adelaide 36ers
 Perth Wildcats

The NBL tie-breaker system as outlined in the NBL Rules and Regulations states that in the case of an identical win–loss record, the results in games played between the teams will determine order of seeding.

Bracket

Semi-finals series

(1) Cairns Taipans vs (4) Perth Wildcats

Regular season series

Tied 2–2 in the regular season series; 303-291 points differential to Cairns:

(2) New Zealand Breakers vs (3) Adelaide 36ers

Tied 2–2 in the regular season series; 356-340 points differential to New Zealand:

Grand Final series

(1) Cairns Taipans vs (2) New Zealand Breakers

Regular season series

Cairns won 3–1 in the regular season series:

See also
 2014–15 NBL season

References

Finals
National Basketball League (Australia) Finals
2015 in New Zealand basketball